Karl Ludwig Wilhelm Oppermann (12 November 1766, Darmstadt - 2 July 1831, Vyborg) was a German-born engineer, surveyor, army officer and fortification builder in the service of the Imperial Russian Army. He fought in the Napoleonic Wars and was a member of the State Council, Director of the Engineering and Building Department, Head of the Engineering and Artillery School and the school guard sub-ensigns and cavalry cadets, director of the maps and the hydrographic depot and an honorary member of the Imperial Academy of Sciences.

Life
From a middle-class family in the Landgraviate of Hesse-Darmstadt, his father was a privy councilor and a major dignitary at the court whilst research suggests his mother was a half-sister of Ludwig Heinrich von Nicolay (1737-1820). He was educated in engineering and mathematics and initially joined the Hessian army in 1779, in which he was promoted to engineer-captain in 1783. He also decided to move to Russia in 1783 - Nicolay was already there, occupying high posts in the court of the future Paul I of Russia and a confidant of both him and his wife Maria Feodorovna.

External links
http://aalto.vbgcity.ru/node/526

German emigrants to Russia
1766 births
1831 deaths
Military personnel from Darmstadt
German military engineers